Area code 435 is a telephone area code in the North American Numbering Plan (NANP) for most of the U.S. state of Utah. The numbering plan area excludes the region of the Wasatch Front, which comprises the Salt Lake City, Ogden, and Provo metropolitan areas in northern Utah, and is served by area codes 801 and 385. Area code 435 was created in 1997 in a split of 801.

History
The state of Utah was a single numbering plan area, with area code 801, when the American Telephone and Telegraph Company (AT&T) devised the first nationwide telephone numbering plan in 1947.

On September 21, 1997, the 801 numbering plan area was reduced to just a four-county area around and including Salt Lake City to provide more telephone numbers in that region.  The rest of the state, much less populated, received the new area code 435. This numbering plan area includes Beaver, Brigham City, Castle Dale, Cedar City, Coalville, Duchesne, Fillmore, Heber City, Hurricane, Junction, Kanab, Loa, Logan, Manila, Manti, Moab, Monticello, Nephi, Park City, Panguitch, Parowan, Price, Randolph, Richfield, St. George, Tooele, Washington, and Vernal.

The area code is also used for the Colorado City, AZ school district.

435 is one of the most thinly populated area codes in the nation; the great majority of Utah's population—and with it, most of its landlines and cell phones—is located along the Wasatch Front. As a result, 435 is nowhere near exhaustion. The projected exhaust date for 435 is 2041.

See also
List of NANP area codes
North American Numbering Plan

References

External links

 List of exchanges from AreaCodeDownload.com, 435 Area Code

435
435